The Women's Finalissima is a future official super cup football match organised by CONMEBOL and UEFA and contested by the winners of the Copa América Femenina and UEFA Women's Championship. Organised as a quadrennial one-off match, it is a women's equivalent to the CONMEBOL–UEFA Cup of Champions. The competition was announced in 2022 as part of a renewed partnership between CONMEBOL and UEFA.

History
On 12 February 2020, UEFA and CONMEBOL signed a renewed memorandum of understanding meant to enhance cooperation between the two organisations. As part of the agreement, a joint UEFA–CONMEBOL committee examined the possibility of staging European–South American intercontinental matches, for both men's and women's football and across various age groups. On 15 December 2021, UEFA and CONMEBOL again signed a renewed memorandum of understanding lasting until 2028, which included specific provisions on opening a joint office in London and the potential organisation of various football events.

On 2 June 2022, the day after staging the 2022 Finalissima, CONMEBOL and UEFA announced a series of new events between teams from the two confederations. This included a match between the winners of South America's Copa América Femenina and the winners of Europe's UEFA Women's Championship. The first edition will take place on 6 April 2023 at Wembley Stadium in London, England, between Brazil, winners of the 2022 Copa América Femenina, and England, winners of UEFA Women's Euro 2022.

Results

See also
 CONMEBOL–UEFA Cup of Champions

References

External links
 

UEFA competitions for women's national teams
CONMEBOL competitions for women's national teams
Quadrennial sporting events
Recurring sporting events established in 2022
2022 establishments in Europe
2022 establishments in South America